The 1925 All-Pro Team consists of American football players chosen by various selectors as the best players at their positions for the All-Pro team of the National Football League (NFL) for the 1925 NFL season.

Selectors and key
For the 1925 season, there are four known selectors of All-Pro Teams. They are:

GB = A poll conducted by the Green Bay Press-Gazette identified first and second teams. The selections were based on polling of sports editors at a dozen newspapers in the NFL area.

CE = Selected by E.G. Brands, a correspondent for Collyer's Eye, a sports journal published in Chicago.

JC = Joseph Carr, NFL Commissioner (1921–1939)

OSJ = Ohio State Journal, including first and second teams and honorable mentions.

Players selected by multiple selectors as first-team All-Pros are displayed in bold typeface. Players who have been inducted into the Pro Football Hall of Fame are designated with a "†" next to their names.

Selections by position

Ends

Tackles

Guards

Centers

Quarterbacks

Halfbacks

Fullbacks

References

All-Pro Teams
1925 National Football League season